Magnolia splendens, commonly known as the laurel magnolia, shining magnolia or locally as the laurel sabino, is a magnolia native to the eastern Puerto Rico. It is a medium to large evergreen tree 16–80 ft tall with dark green leaves and showy cream or white flowers. The wood is aromatic, giving its common epithet of 'laurel'. It was described by German botanist Ignatz Urban in 1899.

References

splendens
Endemic flora of Puerto Rico
Garden plants of Central America
Ornamental trees
Flora without expected TNC conservation status